Jenkyns is a surname and may be:

 Caesar Jenkyns (1866–1941), Welsh international footballer
 Richard Jenkyns (1782–1854), English academic administrator and dean
Richard Jenkyns (born 1949), Professor of the Classical Tradition at Oxford University
 William Jenkyn (1613–1685), English clergyman

See also 
 Jenkins
 Jenkins (surname)